Ross King may refer to:

 Ross King (author) (born 1962), Canadian author
 Ross King (ice hockey) (1919–1972), Canadian gold medal winning goaltender at the 1948 Winter Olympics
 Ross King (presenter), Scottish-American television presenter
 Ross King (singer), Christian singer-songwriter  
 Ross D. King, professor of computer science and creator of Robot Scientist
 Ross King (footballer) (born 1943), Australian rules footballer for Fitzroy
 Ross King (hurler) (born 1993), Irish hurler